Nyassachromis prostoma is a species of fish in the family Cichlidae. It is endemic to Lake Malawi and found in Malawi and Tanzania.

References

prostoma
Fish of Lake Malawi
Fish of Tanzania
Fish of Malawi
Fish described in 1935
Taxonomy articles created by Polbot